Daniel A. Bell (born 22 May 1964) is a Canadian political theorist. He is currently Chair of Political Theory at the University of Hong Kong Faculty of Law. He was previously Dean of the School of Political Science and Public Administration at Shandong University and professor at Tsinghua University (Schwarzman College and Department of Philosophy).

Education and career 
Bell was born in Montreal, educated at McGill University and the University of Oxford, has taught in Singapore, Hong Kong, Beijing, and Shanghai, and has held research fellowships at Princeton's University Center for Human Values, Stanford's Center for Advanced Study in the Behavioral Sciences and Hebrew University's Department of Political Science. In his book The Dean of Shandong he writes about his experience as a dean at Shandong University between 2017 an 2022 and what they say about China.

He has put forward his views in favour of China's political meritocracy and against one person one vote as a mode of selection for political leaders in two books and in comments published in The New York Times, the Financial Times, and in regular columns published in The Huffington Post, in Project Syndicate, in The Guardian, as well as the Chinese-language periodical South Reviews and a Chinese-language blog site on Caijing. He was the recipient of the Huilin Prize in 2018. In his book China's New Confucianism (Chinese: 中国新儒家), he argues that Confucian social hierarchies actually contribute to economic equality in China. He also pointed out that Confucianism influenced how he acts a political theorist and a teacher.

Works 
Bell is the author of books including:
 
 The China Model: Political Meritocracy and the Limits of Democracy, Princeton University Press, 2015. .
 The Spirit of Cities: Why the Identity of a City Matters in a Global Age [co-authored with Avner de-Shalit], Princeton University Press, 2011. .
 China's New Confucianism: Politics and Everyday Life in a Changing Society, Princeton University Press, 2010. .
 Beyond Liberal Democracy: Political Thinking for an East Asian Context, Princeton University Press, 2006. .
 East Meets West: Human Rights and Democracy in East Asia, Princeton University Press, 2000. .
 Towards Liberal Democracy in Pacific Asia [co-authored with David Brown, Kanishka Jayasuriya, and David Martin Jones], Palgrave Macmillan, 1995. .
 Communitarianism and Its Critics, Oxford University Press, 1993. .

He is the series editor of a translation series by Princeton University Press that aims to translate the original works of Chinese scholars:
 Joseph Chan’s Confucian Perfectionism: A Political Philosophy for Modern Times, Princeton University Press, 2013. .
 Jiang Qing’s A Confucian Constitutional Order: How China's Ancient Past Can Shape Its Political Future [co-edited with Ruiping Fan, Translated by Edmund Ryden], Princeton University Press, 2012. .
 Yan Xuetong’s Ancient Chinese Thought, Modern Chinese Power [co-edited with Sun Zhe, Translated by Edmund Ryden], Princeton University Press, 2011. .

He is also the editor of Confucian Political Ethics (Princeton University Press) and the co-editor of six books:
 Just Hierarchy: Why Social Hierarchies Matter in China and the Rest of the World [co-edited with Wang Pei], Princeton University Press, 2020.
 The East Asian Challenge for Democracy: Political Meritocracy in Comparative Perspective [co-edited with Chenyang Li], Cambridge University Press, 2013. .
 Confucian Political Ethics, Princeton University Press, 2007. .
 Ethics in Action: The Ethical Challenges of International Human Rights Nongovernmental Organizations [co-edited with Jean-Marc Coicaud], Cambridge University Press, 2006. .
 The Politics of Affective Relations: East Asia and Beyond (Global Encounters: Studies in Comparative Political Theory series) [co-edited with Hahm Chaihark], Lexington Books, 2004. .
 Confucianism for the Modern World [co-edited with Hahm Chaibong], Cambridge University Press, 2003..
 Forms of Justice: Critical Perspectives on David Miller's Political Philosophy [co-edited with Avner de-Shalit], Rowman & Littlefield Publishers, 2002. .
 The East Asian Challenge for Human Rights [co-edited with Joanne R. Bauer], Cambridge University Press, 1999. .

References

External links 
 

1964 births
Anglophone Quebec people
Alumni of the University of Oxford
Canadian political philosophers
McGill University alumni
Living people
Academic staff of Shandong University
Academic staff of Tsinghua University
People from Montreal
Political philosophers
Political scientists
Academic staff of the University of Hong Kong